Skogheim is a surname. Notable people with the surname include:

Dag Skogheim (1928–2015), Norwegian teacher, poet, novelist, short story writer, biographer and non-fiction writer
Jørn Skogheim (born 1970), Norwegian multi-instrumentalist musician and composer
Vegard Skogheim (born 1966), Norwegian football coach and former midfielder